Bangkok University Gallery or BUG is a museum in Bangkok, Thailand.

The Bangkok University Gallery is a private two-floor gallery on Bangkok University's Kluai Nam Thai campus. It is described by Bangkok Art Map as "one of Bangkok's biggest and best".

References

Museums in Bangkok
University museums in Thailand
Art museums and galleries in Thailand